Greenfield Energy Centre is a natural gas-fired power station located in Courtright, Ontario. It produces 1,005 MW of electricity and is the second largest natural gas-fired power plant in Canada.

Greenfield consists of three Siemens Westinghouse gas turbine generators, a single 517 MW Toshiba steam turbine generator, and three Deltek heat recovery steam generators.

See also
List of largest power stations in Canada
List of natural gas-fired power stations in Canada

References

External links
 

Natural gas-fired power stations in Ontario
2008 establishments in Ontario
Energy infrastructure completed in 2008
Buildings and structures in Lambton County